Bradyrhizobium canariense is a species of legume-root nodulating, endosymbiont nitrogen-fixing bacterium. It is acid-tolerant and nodulates endemic genistoid legumes from the Canary Islands. The type strain is BTA-1T (=ATCC BAA-1002T =LMG 22265T =CFNE 1008T).

References

Further reading

External links

LPSN
Type strain of Bradyrhizobium canariense at BacDive -  the Bacterial Diversity Metadatabase

Nitrobacteraceae
Bacteria described in 2005